Jusélius Mausoleum is one of the most famous sights in Pori, Finland, located at the 1884 opened Käppärä Cemetery. It is the only mausoleum in Finland and was completed in 1903.

Sigrid Juselius 
The mausoleum was built by local businessman Fritz Arthur Jusélius (1855–1930) for his daughter Sigrid (1887–1898) to be her last place of rest. Sigrid died of tuberculosis at the age of eleven. Her sarcophagus is placed in the basement of the mausoleum. It can be seen from the upper floor. The sarcophagus is made of white Italian marble and designed by architect Jarl Eklund.

Fritz Arthur Jusélius himself is also buried in the mausoleum in its side wing. His two wives have their resting places outside the mausoleum. The Sigrid Juselius Foundation was established in 1930 to promote medical research in Finland.

Mauseoleum 
Juselius Mausoleum was built in 1901–1903. It was planned by Josef Stenbäck in the Gothic Revival style. The famous Finnish artist Akseli Gallen-Kallela painted the interior, including frescoes "Kevät" (Spring), "Rakennus" (Construction), "Tuonelan joella" (By the River of Tuonela), "Hävitys" (Destruction), "Talvi" (Winter) and "Syksy" (Autumn). The original frescoes were destroyed by fire in 1931. They were repainted by Gallen-Kallela's son Jorma Gallen-Kallela in 1933–1939 based on preserved sketches and the mausoleum was opened again in 1941. Decorations include Masonic symbolism since Akseli Gallen-Kallela and F.A. Jusélius both were dedicated Freemasons.

Another famous Finnish artist, Pekka Halonen, painted the frescoes on the vestibule. They were destroyed as well, but never repainted. The door of the building is made of bronze; it was constructed by Finnish sculptor Alpo Sailo.

Juselius Mausoleum and the surrounding Käppärä Cemetery are listed as Cultural environments of national significance by the Finnish National Board of Antiquities.

Frescos

References

External links 
 

Buildings and structures in Pori
Mausoleums
Josef Stenbäck buildings
Tourist attractions in Satakunta
Religious buildings and structures completed in 1903
Gothic Revival architecture in Finland